Kunal Karan Kapoor (born 22 August 1982) is an Indian actor who made his debut in 2004 with Remix as Varun. His first success came with Left Right Left where he was seen as Cadet Yadhuvansh Sahni / Yudi.

His breakthrough came with the lead role in the successful show Na Bole Tum Na Maine Kuch Kaha, he received praises for portraying Mohan Bhatnagar. Kunal then went onto play lead roles in Doli Armaanon Ki (as Shaurya Ishaan Sinha) and Woh Apna Sa (as Krishna Shikhawat) 

He made his web debut in 2020, with The Raikar Case playing Mohit Naik Raikar. He was last seen in Ziddi Dil Maane Na as Siddharth Ganju.

Career

Debut and early career (2004–2011)
In 2004, Kapoor debuted in his first TV serial, Remix, which aired on channel Star One. His next serial was Left Right Left for Sab TV in 2006. It was around this time that he changed his screen name to avoid any confusion with film actor Kunal Kapoor. He added his father's name, Karan, as a middle name.

In 2008 he appeared as Monty in the serial Meet Mila De Rabba for Sony Entertainment Television, and in 2009 he played Sukhi Singh in Maayka for Zee Anmol. Then in 2009, he portrayed Angad Yadav, a negative character in Star Plus' Mann Kee Awaaz Pratigya. His performance in this serial received good reviews. In 2010 he played Amrik Singh in the Colors TV serial Rishton Se Badi Pratha.

Breakthrough and further success (2012–2018)
At the end of 2011, he got a lead role in the Colors TV serial Na Bole Tum Na Maine Kuch Kaha. Kapoor had auditioned for the production house some time earlier and Sudhir Sharma of Sunshine Productions saw that audition tape. He felt that Kapoor was best suited to play the male lead opposite stage actress Aakanksha Singh. The serial started airing on 9 January 2012. Kapoor played the role of rustic, carefree, righteous reporter Mohan Bhatnagar. His performance was applauded by TV industry professionals, the media and viewers. His role was later termed 'iconic' and the serial was called a cult show.

On 14 January 2013, Na Bole Tum Na Maine Kuch Kaha returned for a second season by public demand. On 4 May 2013 Kapoor won the award for Best Male Actor in a Lead Role at the 2013 Indian Telly Awards for his performance as Mohan Bhatnagar.

In 2015 Kapoor appeared in Doli Armaano Ki as Shaurya Urmi Sinha, owner and editor of a newspaper. He had worked with the production house before on Maan ki awaaz Pratigya and Rishton Se Badi Pratha. In 2018 he appeared as corrupt police inspector Krishna Shekhawat in Zee TV's serial Woh Apna Sa.

Established actor (2019–present)
In 2019 Kapoor entered web space and acted in the web series The Raikar Case, a family mystery thriller. This series was released on OTT platform VootSelect on 9 April 2020. He played Mohit Naik Raikar. The second season of The Raikar Case is said to be in the pipeline.

He was last seen as Siddharth Ganju in Ziddi Dil Maane Na on Sony SAB.

Filmography

Television

Web series

Short films

Music videos

Awards and nominations

References

External links
 
 

1982 births
Living people
Indian male television actors
Indian male soap opera actors
Male actors from Mumbai